Anthony James "Tony" King (born 21 March 1964) is an Australian businessman who is currently managing director in Australia and New Zealand of Apple Pty Ltd.

Biography
King attended Newington College from 1977 until 1982 when he sat for the Higher School Certificate. He has since been awarded a Bachelor of Commerce and is a member of the Institute of Chartered Accountants of Australia. King has been the director of sales for IBM Asia Pacific's personal computer division and has held executive positions at DELL, Ricoh and PricewaterhouseCoopers. King as worked at Apple since 2003. In 2015 he came to the attention of the general public when he appeared before an Australian Senate committee investigating corporate tax minimisation strategies. In the same year he was appointed to Newington College Council.

References

1964 births
Living people
People educated at Newington College
Businesspeople from Sydney
Australian corporate directors
Australian chief executives
New Zealand chief executives
Members of Newington College Council